José Villalba, also known as Vilalba (1920 in Santo Tomé, Argentina – 1987 in Porto Alegre, Rio Grande do Sul) was Argentine football (soccer) striker.

Little is known about his life. As a player, Villalba played for many clubs of Brazil. With Sport Club Internacional Villalba had a successful career and he is remembered as one of the best strikers of Internacional history. In Gre-Nal derby, Villalba is the second top scorer for Internacional. He scored 20 goals on the history of the derby

Clubs

 Internacional: 1941 - 1944
 Palmeiras: 1944 - 1945
 Atlético Mineiro: 1945 - 1946
 Internacional: 1946 - 1949
 Rio Grande: 1950 - 1954

Honours
 Campeonato Gaúcho: 1941, 1942, 1943, 1947 and 1948

References

1920 births
1987 deaths
Argentine footballers
Association football forwards
Sport Club Internacional players
Sociedade Esportiva Palmeiras players
Clube Atlético Mineiro players
Expatriate footballers in Brazil
People from Santo Tomé, Corrientes
Sportspeople from Corrientes Province